Donna Lynne Champlin (born January 21, 1971) is an American actress, dancer and singer from New York City. She is best known for playing Paula Proctor on The CW comedy-drama series Crazy Ex-Girlfriend.

Early life
Champlin was born in Rochester, New York, to a technical writer mother and a scientist father.  She participated in various lessons, theatre productions, and national and international competitions throughout her childhood, in voice, piano, flute, theatre and dance.

Champlin went on to study musical theatre at Carnegie Mellon University, graduating with her BFA in 1993, and studied abroad as a 1992 Advanced Acting Scholar in Shakespeare and Chekhov at the University of Oxford. In 1992 she won the Princess Grace Foundation Award in Theatre. While still in college, she performed as Dorothy in The Wizard of Oz with Pittsburgh Civic Light Opera.

Career
Champlin took on the title role of Very Warm for May, her Broadway debut in James Joyce's The Dead, then By Jeeves, Hollywood Arms, Sweeney Todd, Billy Elliot the Musical, and The Dark at the Top of the Stairs, for which she won the 2007 Obie Award.  Other credits include: No, No Nanette, Very Good Eddie, First Lady Suite, Harold and Maude, My Life With Albertine, Bloomer Girl, and Jolson.  She also performed with Len Cariou in the Simply Sondheim inaugural concert which celebrated the opening of the Sondheim Center for the Performing Arts.

Champlin's awards include the 2019 Gracie Award for Best Supporting Actress, 2013 Drama Desk Award, 2007 OBIE award, the Princess Grace Award, the title of National Tap Dance Champion four consecutive times, and she has received grants from the National Foundation for Advancement in the Arts, The Anna Sosenko Trust, Princess Grace Foundationand has received The Charlie Willard Memorial Grant.

Champlin's film and television credits include The Dark Half, the 2000 and 2006 Annual Tony Awards, The View, Law & Order, The Good Wife, The Good Fight, The Good Doctorand Live with Regis and Kelly. From 2015 to 2019, she starred in the role of Paula Proctor in The CW comedy-drama series Crazy Ex-Girlfriend., Hortense in Another Period and Barb in Netflix's Feel the Beat. In 2022, she appeared in the Showtime series The First Lady.

Champlin released a solo album entitled Old Friends, performs a one-woman show entitled Finishing the Hat, and teaches acting at the Carnegie Mellon University, the University of Hartford, and New York University. She spends her downtime writing, raising money for JDRF, BCEFA, The Actors Fundand lives with her family in NYC.

Personal life
Champlin married actor Andrew Arrow in 2010 and they have one child. They live in New York City.

Filmography

Television

Film

Podcasts

Theatre credits

Awards and nominations

References

External links 
 

American film actresses
American television actresses
American stage actresses
Carnegie Mellon University College of Fine Arts alumni
Alumni of the University of Oxford
New York University faculty
University of Hartford faculty
Carnegie Mellon University faculty
Living people
Princess Grace Awards winners
1971 births
21st-century American actresses
Actresses from Rochester, New York
21st-century American singers
Singers from New York (state)
Educators from New York (state)
American women educators
20th-century American actresses
20th-century American women singers
20th-century American singers